Werner Rosener is a West German retired slalom canoeist who competed in the late 1960s and the early 1970s. He won two bronze medals at the 1969 ICF Canoe Slalom World Championships in Bourg St.-Maurice, earning them in the K-1 and K-1 team events.

References

German male canoeists
Living people
Year of birth missing (living people)
Medalists at the ICF Canoe Slalom World Championships